The Northern Kittitas County Tribune is a weekly newspaper based in Cle Elum, Washington, United States. It was founded in 1953 and publishes on Thursdays with a circulation of approximately 3,650. In 1962, it purchased the Cle Elum Miner Echo, which had been publishing since 1928, and suspended its publication; it took over the Miner Echo's building for its own publication. The newspaper is owned by Oahe Publishing.

It won awards in 2000 and 2004. The current editor of the Northern Kittitas County Tribune is Jana Stoner.

References

External links 
 Official website
 Library of Congress entry

Newspapers published in Washington (state)
Kittitas County, Washington
1953 establishments in Washington (state)